La Voz Hispana de Virginia magazine is the only Hispanic magazine in the U.S. state of Virginia and was recognized in 2005 as the "best Latino publication in the state" by Governor Mark Warner. Varied topics of interest are covered in both English and Spanish from cultural, arts, and music events to community news. The magazine is headquartered in Richmond, Virginia and is published monthly.

References

External links
 Official Website

Visual arts magazines published in the United States
Monthly magazines published in the United States
Hispanic and Latino American culture in Virginia
Local interest magazines published in the United States
Magazines published in Virginia
Mass media in Richmond, Virginia
Spanish-language magazines
Spanish-language mass media in Virginia
Magazines with year of establishment missing